This is an alphabetical, incomplete, list of different motu proprios by pontifical authors.

References